The Long Way Home (lit. "Western Front") is a 2015 South Korean film written and directed by Cheon Sung-il, about the friendship between a South Korean and a North Korean soldier during the Korean War.

Plot 
Set during the Korean War and 3 days before a truce takes place. Nam-Bok (Sol Kyung-Gu) is South Korean soldier. He was a simple farmer before his conscription into the military. Nam-Bok then receives order to deliver a top secret document at a set time and place, but an attack by the North Korean army causes Nam-Bok to lose the document.

Meanwhile, Young-Gwang (Yeo Jin-Goo) is a North Korean soldier. He is a part of a tank crew. While heading to the South, his team is bombed and he is the only one left. He is about to return home, but he happens to come across a top secret document.

The two men face off in the western front alone.

Cast 
 Sol Kyung-gu as Jang Nam-bok
 Yeo Jin-goo as Kim Young-kwang
 Lee Geung-young as Lieutenant Yoo
 Jung Sung-hwa as General Yeon
 Jung In-gi as Sergeant Kim
 Jo Hee-bong as Drunkard
 Kim Won-hae as Deputy Jeon
 Jung Suk-won as Senior lieutenant
 Kim Sun-young as Ajumma
 Noh Young-hak as Petty officer Choi
 Song Kyung-chul as Sang-joo
 Kim Tae-hoon as General Jo
 Ji Chang-wook as Conscription officer
 Yang Byung-yeol as Second lieutenant Ahn

References

External links 
 

South Korean war drama films
Korean War films
2015 films
2010s South Korean films